Po Saut (?–1693), also spelled Po Saot or Po Sot, was the king of Panduranga Champa who ruled from 1660 to 1692. In Vietnamese records, he was mentioned as Bà Tranh (婆爭). He was also the last king of independent Champa.

Po Saut was a son of Po Rome. He was of Churu and Rhade parentage. He was a Muslim; in 1685, he requested a copy of the Quran from Father Ferret, a French missionary serving in Champa.

Champa came into conflict with Vietnam. Po Saut revolted against Vietnamese Nguyễn lord in 1692. Soon Champa was conquered by Vietnamese general Nguyễn Hữu Cảnh, Po Saut was captured and transferred to Phú Xuân (present-day Huế). In there, Nguyễn Phúc Chu gave him a royal pardon. He died in the next year.

References

Kings of Champa
Rade people
Churu people
1693 deaths
Year of birth unknown
Muslim monarchs